Do Chor is a 1972 Hindi romantic drama film produced by Raj Khosla and directed by Padmanabh. It stars Dharmendra, Tanuja, Shobhana Samarth, K.N. Singh, Trilok Kapoor and Jalal Agha.  The music is by R.D. Burman and the lyrics by Majrooh Sultanpuri. The film did well at the box office.

Plot 
A series of mysterious burglaries take place at the homes of four wealthy men. The burglar takes a single piece of jewellery from each of the men, but not touching the cash and other jewellery, and leaving the calling card of a swastika. The police suspect Tony generally known in the community as a thief, but he claims innocence.  He tries to find out who the real burglar is and catches Sandhya stealing from one of the wealthy men.  She tells him that she is taking back what is really her inheritance, as these items belong to her mother since these four men swindled her mother after her father's death.  Her mother is now in a mental institution. Tony and Sandhya fall in love.  He helps her recover all of her items and put the wealthy men behind bars. Sandhya's mother is well again. Tony and Sandhya promise to start a life together after they complete their short jail sentences.

Cast
Dharmendra as Tony
Tanuja as Sandhya
K. N. Singh as Tribhuvan Singh
Trilok Kapoor as Police Commissioner
Jagdish Raj as Police Inspector
Bhagwan Dada as Police Constable
Laxmi Chhaya as Chameli
Dhumal as Tikamdas
Sajjan as Ramsharan
Murad as Advocate
Randhir as Seth Charandas
Krishnakant as Gopichand
Shobhna Samarth as Mrs. Vikram Singh
Asit Sen as Bhagwandas
Leela Mishra as Mrs. Bhagwandas
Jalal Agha as Badru
Mohan Choti as Kaalia
Gurnam Singh as Jaggu

Soundtrack

References

External links 
 

1972 films
1970s Hindi-language films
Films scored by R. D. Burman
Indian crime drama films
Indian romantic drama films
1972 crime drama films
1972 romantic drama films